Jasmin Samardžić (born 27 January 1974) is a Croatian retired football striker, who last played for Draga in Croatia’s lower divisions.

Career
He had spent much of his career playing for various clubs in Croatia’s Prva HNL, including 124 league games for his hometown club Rijeka. He also had a two-year stint in Germany with Eintracht Braunschweig.

Career statistics

References

External links
 
Jasmin Samardžić at HNL-statistika.com

1974 births
Living people
Footballers from Rijeka
Association football forwards
Croatian footballers
Croatia under-21 international footballers
HNK Rijeka players
Eintracht Braunschweig players
HNK Orijent players
NK Pomorac 1921 players
NK Zagreb players
NK Krk players
Croatian Football League players
Regionalliga players
First Football League (Croatia) players
Croatian expatriate footballers
Expatriate footballers in Germany
Croatian expatriate sportspeople in Germany